Answer Me! (typically rendered ANSWER Me!) was a magazine edited by Jim Goad and Debbie Goad and published between 1991 and 1994. It focused on the social pathologies of interest to the Los Angeles–based couple.

Answer Me! also featured illustrations by  racist antisemitic cartoonist Nick Bougas.

Issue 4 of Answer Me! was the subject of a high-profile obscenity trial against two booksellers whose magazine store carried the issue.

Issues

Issue No. 1
Released 31 October 1991.

Featured interviews with Russ Meyer, Timothy Leary, Holly Woodlawn, Kid Frost, Public Enemy, Iceberg Slim, and pieces on Bakersfield, California, Sunset Boulevard, masturbation in literature, and Twelve-Step programs.

Issue No. 2
Released 17 July 1992.

Featured Anton LaVey, David Duke, Al Goldstein, El Duce of The Mentors, the Geto Boys, Ray Dennis Steckler, 100 serial killers and mass murderers, Vietnamese gangs, and Mexican murder magazines.

Issue No. 3
Released 19 July 1993.

Featured Jack Kevorkian, Al Sharpton, NAMBLA, the Kids of Widney High, Boyd Rice, Suzanne Muldowney, 100 suicides, guns, Andrei Chikatilo, pedophilia in Steven Spielberg's work, Mexican deformity comics, paintings and drawings by murderers, and a prank call to a suicide hotline.

Issue No. 4
Released 1994.

Known as "The Rape Issue", features a teen-mag-style interview with Richard Ramirez, Donny the Punk, work by Molly Kiely, Boyd Rice, Randall Phillip, Shaun Partridge, Adam Parfrey (on Andrea Dworkin), Peter Sotos (with illustrations by Trevor Brown), pieces on amputation, the police, racist country & western music, and Chocolate Impulse.

The book
The first three issues were released in a collection with autobiographical introductory pieces by Debbie and Jim.  It was first published as Answer Me!: The First Three by AK Press.

It was reissued, along with 60 pages of new material, by Scapegoat Publishing in 2006.

According to Jim Goad's website , a collection of issues #1–4 "will be reprinted this year."

Controversy 
In 1995, a complaint about issue no. 4 being sold at a Bellingham, Washington magazine store known as The Newsstand resulted in owners Ira Stohl and Kristina Hjelsand being tried on charges of distribution of obscenity. Charged with one felony count of promoting pornography, they faced a maximum sentence of five years in jail and a $10,000 fine. The defendants were found not guilty. A later lawsuit against the City of Bellingham by Stohl and Hjelsand resulted in the City paying $1.3 million to the plaintiffs on the grounds of violation of First Amendment rights and infliction of emotional distress.

Chocolate Impulse
Chocolate Impulse was a "hoax zine" created by Jim and Debbie Goad, publishers of Answer Me!. Wanting to address the negative feedback they'd received from the zine community, the Goads wrote and distributed a pseudonymous screed against themselves (in which they claimed to be the lesbian couple "Valerie Chocolate" and "Faith Impulse"), going so far as to set up a fake address for it in Kentucky. The zine received some positive response from the publishers of Feminist Baseball and other zines that had negatively reviewed the Goads. In issue #4 of Answer Me!, Jim Goad revealed the prank and insulted those who had taken the bait.

References

External links
 Short survey with images from The First Three
 Review of The First Three
 Amazon.com page for The First Three
 "A Little 'zine Called ANSWER Me! Demands a Verdict by Bob Armstrong, an article covering the obscenity trial in Bellingham, from X Magazine
 "Zines, etc." by Carrie McLaren, a review of ANSWER Me! in Stay Free! (#10).  Letter to the editor from Jim Goad in response.

Defunct political magazines published in the United States
Satirical magazines published in the United States
Annual magazines published in the United States
Criticism of feminism
Defunct magazines published in the United States
Magazines established in 1991
Magazines disestablished in 1994
Obscenity controversies in literature
1991 establishments in the United States
Magazines published in Los Angeles